Koneru Konappa is an Indian politician and a legislator of Telangana Legislature. He won from  Sirpur on BSP ticket but joined Telangana Rashtra Samithi.

References

People from Telangana
Living people
People from Komaram Bheem district
Telangana Rashtra Samithi politicians
Telangana MLAs 2014–2018
Year of birth missing (living people)
Telangana MLAs 2018–2023